The Cuomo family is an American political family. It includes Mario Cuomo and Matilda Cuomo (née Raffa) and their five children: Margaret, Andrew, Maria, Madeline, and Christopher. Mario Cuomo and his son Andrew Cuomo both have served as governor of New York.

Mario Cuomo's parents, Andrea and Immacolata Cuomo, both immigrated to the United States from Tramonti, Italy; Andrea in 1926 and Immacolata in 1927. Matilda Raffa Cuomo's parents both immigrated to the United States from Sicily; Carmelo "Charles" Raffa arrived in New York in 1927, and Mary (née Gitto) Raffa in 1928.
 Mario Cuomo (June 15, 1932 – January 1, 2015), unsuccessful candidate for Lieutenant Governor of New York (1974); appointed New York Secretary of State by Governor Hugh Carey (1975–1978); unsuccessful candidate in 1977 Democratic primary for mayor of New York City (lost to Ed Koch); unsuccessful Liberal Party of New York candidate in general election for mayor of New York City (1977), again losing to Ed Koch; Lieutenant Governor of New York 1979–1982; Governor of New York (1983–1994); keynote speaker at the 1984 Democratic National Convention in San Francisco.
 Matilda Cuomo (born September 16, 1931), First Lady of New York (1983–1994); educator and lifelong advocate for women, children, and families; proponent of New York State Mentoring Program; founder of Mentoring USA nonprofit organization; inducted into National Women's Hall of Fame in 2017.
 Margaret Cuomo (born March 29, 1955) daughter of Matilda and Mario Cuomo, is a physician and radiologist; author and advocate of cancer prevention; co-founder of the Italian Language Foundation.
 Andrew Cuomo (born December 6, 1957), son of Mario and Matilda Cuomo; United States Secretary of Housing and Urban Development (1997–2001); New York State Attorney General (2007–2010); governor of New York (2011–2021). From 1990 to 2003, Andrew Cuomo was married to Kerry Kennedy, daughter of Robert F. Kennedy and Ethel Skakel. After Cuomo and Kennedy divorced, Cuomo dated Food Network host Sandra Lee from 2005 until September 2019. Andrew resigned as governor on August 24, 2021 in response to sexual harassment allegations.
 Maria Cuomo Cole (born 1960), daughter of Matilda and Mario Cuomo, producer of social impact films at Cuomo Cole Productions, chairwoman of the charitable foundation Help USA, married to Kenneth Cole, a New York fashion designer.
 Madeline Cuomo (born 1964), daughter of Matilda and Mario Cuomo, attorney, specializing in matrimonial law, graduate of Albany Law School.
 Christopher Cuomo (born August 9, 1970), son of Mario Cuomo and Matilda Cuomo; anchor and host of Cuomo on NewsNation; former CNN anchor; former host of Cuomo Prime Time evening news program; former ABC News chief law and justice correspondent; former news anchor for Good Morning America; co-anchor for ABC's 20/20; winner of six national Emmys. On December 4, 2021 Chris was fired from CNN due to violations of journalism ethics and standards involving his brother Andrew's political position, in addition to allegations of sexual misconduct.

References 

 
American families of Italian ancestry
New York (state) Democrats
Political families of the United States
Roman Catholic families
Andrew Cuomo